Sumacàrcer is a municipality in the comarca of Ribera Alta in the Valencian Community, Spain.

Main sights 

 Palace of los condes de Orgaz: Construction dated in the end of the Middle Ages (15th century), represents the typical rural palace of the Valencian nobility. Originally, this palace belonged to the period when the town belonged to the Orgaz lordship, where some of the members of this lineage were born and lived. The architectural features which form it: a square with a central courtyard, patio with Carpantic arches from the 15th century, remains of the old town and door of entrance from the Renaissance.

References

Municipalities in the Province of Valencia
Ribera Alta (comarca)